Bakaye Dibassy (born 11 August 1989) is a professional footballer who plays for Minnesota United and the Mali national team.

International career
Dibassy was born in France and is of Malian descent. Dibassy made his debut for the Mali national team in a 6–0 2018 FIFA World Cup qualification loss to Morocco on 1 September 2017.

Career statistics

Club

International

References

Living people
1989 births
Footballers from Paris
Association football defenders
Citizens of Mali through descent
Malian footballers
Mali international footballers
French footballers
French sportspeople of Malian descent
Ligue 1 players
Ligue 2 players
Olympique Noisy-le-Sec players
Bergerac Périgord FC players
Stade Montois (football) players
CS Sedan Ardennes players
Amiens SC players
Minnesota United FC players
Major League Soccer players